On the film review aggregation website Rotten Tomatoes, films that every surveyed critic considered bad have a 0% rating. As of 2023, 43 films with more than 20 reviews have received this rating.

The Ringer, analyzing films' Rotten Tomatoes scores compared to change in profit margin, estimated that a film with a 0% rating "would be expected to lose about $25 million relative to its budget".

List

See also

 List of films considered the best
 List of films considered the worst
 List of films with a 100% rating on Rotten Tomatoes

References

External links
The Rotten Tomatoes 0% Club | RT Essentials | Movieclips on YouTube

Rotten Tomatoes
Films